Emil Westman (b. 13 March 1894, Stockholm, Sweden; d. 19 June 1935, Copenhagen, Denmark) was a Swedish-Danish artist.

Westman studied at Herlufsholm School and the Royal Institute of Art in Stockholm. He moved to Copenhagen in 1913 and became a Danish citizen in the same year and was taught by Kristian Zahrtmann. His artwork was exhibited at a solo exhibition in Copenhagen and Svendborg in 1922. He was one of the founding members of the Swedish-Danish art school Koloristerne in 1931. 

Some of his work is held at the British Museum in London.

He was the father of Gunnar Westman.

References 

1894 births
1935 deaths
20th-century Swedish artists
People educated at Herlufsholm School
Swedish expatriates in Denmark
20th-century Danish artists
Royal Institute of Art alumni
Artists from Stockholm

Westman family